In Irish mythology, Uaithne is The Dagda's harper. Uaithne (Uaitniu) could mean "wood", "work", "pillar" or "harmony". Those different meanings could be the consequence of successive metaphors.

The Dagda's harp is called Daur da Bláo, The Oak of Two Blossoms, and sometimes Coir cethar chuir, the Four Angled Music.

After the Second Battle of Mag Tuired the Fomorians had taken The Dagda's harp with them. The Dagda found it in a feasting-house wherein Bres and his father Elathan were also. The Dagda had bound the music so that it would not sound until he would call to it. After he called to it, it sprang from the wall, came to the Dagda and killed nine men on its way.

"An Uaithne" is also the original name of Irish choir Anúna.

In The Cattle-Raid of Fraech, its name is given as meaning 'Child-Birth', and that Boannd has three sons that were the three 'chants' of Uaithne. The Sorrow-strain, Joy-strain and Sleep strain, stating the origin of these three as "The time the woman was at the bearing of children it had a cry of sorrow with the soreness of the pangs at first: it was smile and joy it played in the middle for the pleasure of bringing forth the two sons: it was a sleep of soothingness played the last son, on account of the heaviness of the birth, so that it is from him that the third of the music has been named."

References

Tuatha Dé Danann
Mythological musical instruments